Jefferson County is a county located in the U.S. state of Indiana.  As of 2020, the population was 33,147.  The county seat is Madison.

History
Jefferson County was formed on February 1, 1811, from Dearborn and Clark Counties. It was named for Thomas Jefferson, principal draftsman of the Northwest Ordinance and President of the United States from 1801 through 1809.

Jefferson County was one of Indiana's first counties, and many important early Hoosiers came from Madison, including William Hendricks. Throughout the early history of the state, Madison was one of the leading cities competing with Vincennes, and later New Albany, to be the largest city in the state. The county fell into economic decline after the American Civil War, as industry began to shift from southern Indiana to the northern part of the state.

On the evening of May 20, 2009, the county courthouse caught fire. The fire began in the steeple of the courthouse, which was under reconstruction for Madison's bicentenary. The roof of the dome had just been painted gold. Fire departments from across southern Indiana and northern Kentucky arrived to put out the fire which burned for several hours, destroyed much of the inside of the building and the county records. The fire forced the evacuation of the nearby county jail, and effectively shut down the downtown area of the city. It was later determined the fire was accidentally started by workers who were welding on the metal roof dome.

The tallest waterfall in Indiana, Fremont Falls, is located in Hanover.

Geography
Jefferson County makes up the Madison, IN Micropolitan Statistical Area.

Cities and towns
 Brooksburg
 Dupont
 Hanover
 Madison (primary city)

Census-designated places
 Canaan
 Deputy
 Kent

Townships

 Graham
 Hanover
 Lancaster
 Madison
 Milton
 Monroe
 Republican
 Saluda
 Shelby
 Smyrna

Adjacent counties
 Ripley County  (north)
 Switzerland County  (east)
 Carroll County, Kentucky  (southeast)
 Trimble County, Kentucky  (south)
 Clark County (southwest)
 Scott County (west)
 Jennings County (northwest)

Major highways
Sources:  National Atlas, U.S. Census Bureau

  U.S. Route 421
  Indiana State Road 3
  Indiana State Road 7
  Indiana State Road 56
  Indiana State Road 62
  Indiana State Road 250
  Indiana State Road 256
  Indiana State Road 356
  Indiana State Road 362

National protected area
 Big Oaks National Wildlife Refuge (part)

Climate and weather 

Government

The county government is a constitutional body, and is granted specific powers by the Constitution of Indiana, and by the Indiana Code.

County Council: The county council is the legislative branch of the county government and controls all the spending and revenue collection in the county. Representatives are elected from county districts. The council members serve four-year terms. They are responsible for setting salaries, the annual budget, and special spending. The council also has limited authority to impose local taxes, in the form of an income and property tax that is subject to state level approval, excise taxes, and service taxes.

Board of Commissioners: The executive body of the county is made of a board of commissioners. The commissioners are elected county-wide, in staggered terms, and each serves a four-year term. One of the commissioners, typically the most senior, serves as president. The commissioners are charged with executing the acts legislated by the council, collecting revenue, and managing the day-to-day functions of the county government.

Court: The county maintains a small claims court that can handle some civil cases. The judge on the court is elected to a term of four years and must be a member of the Indiana Bar Association. The judge is assisted by a constable who is also elected to a four-year term. In some cases, court decisions can be appealed to the state level circuit court.

County Officials: The county has several other elected offices, including sheriff, coroner, auditor, treasurer, recorder, surveyor, and circuit court clerk Each of these elected officers serves a term of four years and oversees a different part of county government. Members elected to county government positions are required to declare party affiliations and to be residents of the county.

Jefferson County is part of Indiana's 6th congressional district and is represented in Congress by Republican Luke Messer.  It is also part of Indiana Senate district 45 and is split between Indiana House of Representatives districts 66, 67 and 69.

Politics

Demographics

As of the 2010 United States Census, there were 32,428 people, 12,635 households, and 8,456 families residing in the county. The racial makeup of the county was 95.2% white, 1.7% black or African American, 0.7% Asian, 0.2% American Indian, 0.9% from other races, and 1.3% from two or more races. Those of Hispanic or Latino origin made up 2.3% of the population. In terms of ancestry, 23.5% were German, 15.4% were American, 12.9% were Irish, and 11.2% were English.

Of the 12,635 households, 31.4% had children under the age of 18 living with them, 50.5% were married couples living together, 11.4% had a female householder with no husband present, 33.1% were non-families, and 27.2% of all households were made up of individuals. The average household size was 2.42 and the average family size was 2.90. The median age was 39.7 years.

The median income for a household in the county was $47,697 and the median income for a family was $52,343. Males had a median income of $42,629 versus $30,475 for females. The per capita income for the county was $21,278. About 10.2% of families and 15.1% of the population were below the poverty line, including 22.1% of those under age 18 and 10.1% of those age 65 or over.

Education
All Jefferson County residents five years and older are eligible to obtain a free library card from the Jefferson County Public Library in Madison. The public school system in Jefferson County is Madison Consolidated Schools.

See also
 National Register of Historic Places listings in Jefferson County, Indiana

References

External links
 Madison-Jefferson County Public Library

 
Indiana counties
1811 establishments in Indiana Territory
Indiana counties on the Ohio River
Populated places established in 1811